George James Cholmondeley, 1st Marquess of Cholmondeley,  (11 May 1749 – 10 April 1827), styled Viscount Malpas between 1764 and 1770 and known as The Earl of Cholmondeley between 1770 and 1815, was a British peer and politician.

Background and education
Cholmondeley was the son of George Cholmondeley, Viscount Malpas, and Hester Edwardes. George Cholmondeley, 3rd Earl of Cholmondeley, was his grandfather. He was a direct descendant of Sir Robert Walpole, the first Prime Minister of Great Britain. He was educated at Eton. In January 1776, Cholmondeley began an affair with the noted beauty Grace Dalrymple Elliot, allegedly taking her up during a Pantheon masquerade ball. Grace was legally separated from her husband, Dr. John Eliot, who was to divorce her several months later. This liaison lasted for three years.

Career
In 1770 he succeeded his grandfather as fourth Earl of Cholmondeley and entered the House of Lords. In April 1783, Cholmondeley was admitted to the Privy Council and appointed Captain of the Yeomen of the Guard in the government of the Duke of Portland, a post he held until December the same year. He remained out of office for the next 29 years, but in 1812 he was made Lord Steward of the Household in Spencer Perceval's Tory administration. He continued in the post after Lord Liverpool became Prime Minister after Perceval's assassination in May 1812, holding it until 1821.
 
In 1815, Cholmondeley was created Earl of Rocksavage, in the County of Chester, and Marquess of Cholmondeley. He was further honoured when he was made a Knight Grand Cross of the Royal Guelphic Order (Hanoverian Order) in 1819 and a Knight of the Garter in 1822. Apart from his political career, he was also Lord-Lieutenant of Cheshire from 1770 to 1783 and Vice-Admiral of Cheshire from 1770 to 1827.

Cholmondeley Sound, in southeast Alaska, was named for him in 1793 by George Vancouver.

Personal life

Lord Cholmondeley married Lady Georgiana Charlotte Bertie, daughter of Peregrine Bertie, 3rd Duke of Ancaster and Kesteven, on 25 April 1791. Through this marriage the ancient hereditary office of Lord Great Chamberlain came into the Cholmondeley family.
They had three children:
George Horatio Cholmondeley, 2nd Marquess of Cholmondeley (16 Jan 1792 - 8 May 1870)
William Henry Hugh Cholmondeley, 3rd Marquess of Cholmondeley (31 Mar 1800 - 16 Dec 1884)
Lady Charlotte Georgiana (d. 24 June 1828) married Lt.-Col. Hugh Henry Seymour, son of Adm. Lord Hugh Seymour, on 18 May 1818.

Before his marriage to Georgiana, Lord Cholmondeley had had a mistress, Madame St-Albin, and with her had one daughter, Harriet Cholmondeley. 

He inherited Houghton Hall in Norfolk from his great-uncle Horace Walpole in 1797 but preferred to live at Cholmondeley Castle in Cheshire, which had been rebuilt in 1801-04 to his design.

He was friends with the disreputable courtesans Gertrude Mahon, Grace Elliott and Kitty Frederick. According to the betting book for Brooks's, a London gentlemen's club, Cholmondeley once wagered two guineas to Lord Derby, to receive 500 guineas upon having sexual intercourse with a woman "in a balloon one thousand yards from the Earth." It is unknown whether the bet was ever finalised.

Lord Cholmondeley died at age 77 in April 1827, and he was succeeded in his lands, estates and titles by his eldest son George. Lady Cholmondeley died in 1838.

Eighteenth-century English Studies professor and Guggenheim Fellow Arthur Sherbo nominated Lord Cholmondeley as the likely real-life inspiration for the character of Rawdon Crawley in William Makepeace Thackeray's satirical novel Vanity Fair.

Notes

References 
 Debrett, John, Charles Kidd, David Williamson. (1990).  Debrett's Peerage and Baronetage. New York: Macmillan. 
 Lodge, Edmund. (1877).  The Peerage and Baronetage of the British Empire as at Present Existing. London: Hurst and Blackett. OCLC 17221260

External links

 Houghton Hall
  Cholmondeley Castle
 Metropolitan Museum of ArtOil painting of Mrs. Grace Dalrymple Elliott by Thomas Gainsborough (British, 1727–1788), which was "apparently commissioned by her lover, the first Marquess of Cholmondeley, and was exhibited at the Academy in 1778."

|-

1749 births
1827 deaths
Knights of the Garter
Lord-Lieutenants of Cheshire
Members of the Privy Council of Great Britain
George
1
People educated at Eton College